Agnieszka Dominika Pomaska (born on 8 January 1980), is a Polish politician who has been a member of the Sejm since 2009, serving in the 6th, 7th, 8th and 9th terms.

Early life

Agnieszka Pomaska was born in Gdynia on 8 January 1980. Pomaska grew up in the Tricity (Gdańsk-Sopot-Gdynia) and came into contact with water sports as a child. From childhood, she engaged in sports sailing with YKP Gdynia and then with the Sopot Sailing Club. She won, among other awards, the title of the second world runner-up in juniors in the Mistral class.

In 1994, she became the Polish champion in sailing in the Optimist class, in 1998 the second junior runner-up in windsurfing in the Mistral class, and in 2000 the Polish champion in freestyle windsurfing.

Politics

She was active in the Young Democrats Association since 2001, and was a member of the municipal authorities of that organization. From 2002 to 2006, from the list of the Civic Platform, she was elected to the City Council of Gdańsk in 2005, winning 780  votes in the 2nd constituency. She graduated with a degree in political science from the University of Gdańsk the same year. She served as deputy chair of the City Council, and chaired the Tourism and City Promotion Committee. She also became the president of the Centrum Rozwoju Edukacji Obywatelskiej association. She was re-elected in the local elections held a year later, winning a total of 3,410 votes.

Elections
In the 2007 parliamentary elections, she ran for a seat in the Sejm from the Gdańsk district. She ran in the eighth position of the list, led by Sławomir Nowak. She then won 9,495 votes, including more than 7,500 in Gdańsk itself.

She scored was the ninth-best result among the candidates of the Civic Platform, but the party won only eight seats, so she did not enter parliament. However, following the subsequent election of Jarosław Wałęsa to a seat in the European Parliament, Pomaska gained a seat in the Sjem on June 24, 2009, at the age of 29. In 2010, she became the chair of the Civic Platform chapter in Gdańsk, a position she held until 2021.

In the 2011 elections, she successfully ran for re-election, receiving 16,117 votes. For the legislative elections of 9 October 2011, she moved up to fourth place on the list still led by Nowak. Accumulating 16,117 votes, including nearly 13,000 in the county seat of the constituency, she was re-elected with the third-based result among the deputies of the PO. During the 7th term of the Sejm, she was the chairman of the European Union Affairs Committee. In 2015, she became the vice-president of the PO in the Pomeranian Voivodeship.

In 2015, she became the vice-president of the PO in the Pomeranian Voivodeship.

In May 2015, Pomaksa was one of the Polish people sanctioned by Russia during the Russo-Ukrainian War.

She next ran third on the PO list, this time led by Sports Minister Adam Korol, in the legislative elections of October 25, 2015. She was again elected, with 22,196 votes in favour, obtaining the second-best score on the list, coming in ahead of number two Sławomir Neumann, including 16,000 votes in Gdańsk, where she came next after Korol.

In the Sejm of the 8th term, she became the deputy chairman of the European Union Affairs Committee.  At the end of 2017, she became a member of the national board of the Civic Platform.

In the 2019 elections, she successfully ran for parliamentary re-election on behalf of the Civic Coalition, receiving 39,103 votes. In 2021, she unsuccessfully ran for the chairmanship of the PO chapter in the Pomeranian Voivodeship, losing out to the voivodeship marshal, Mieczysław Struk.

References

1980 births
Living people
Members of the Polish Sejm 2019–2023
21st-century Polish women politicians
Women members of the Sejm of the Republic of Poland